Grassy Knob Wilderness is a wilderness area in the Klamath Mountains of southwestern Oregon, within the Rogue River-Siskiyou National Forest. Like most wilderness areas in Oregon, Grassy Knob is managed by the Forest Service.

Topography
Many small streams tumble for short distances over waterfalls and through ravines in the Wilderness. The primary drainage is Dry Creek, a tributary of the Sixes River, and marks the northern boundary of the Wilderness, while the Elk River marks the southern border. The Elk has Wild and Scenic designation.

Vegetation

Grassy Knob Wilderness is home to the Port Orford cedar, including some stands of old growth with some trunks exceeding six feet in diameter.  Old growth Douglas fir exists in the Wilderness as well.

Fish
Both the Elk and Sixes Rivers are major steelhead and salmon streams.  Some claim that the Elk River is the most productive salmon stream of its size outside of Alaska.  Wild native cutthroat trout can also be found here.

Recreation
Popular recreational activities in the Grassy Knob Wilderness include fishing, wildlife watching and hiking, though there are very few established trails.  The Wilderness also offers extraordinary opportunities for solitude.

See also 
 List of Oregon Wildernesses
 List of U.S. Wilderness Areas
 Wilderness Act
 List of old growth forests

References

External links
 Grassy Knob Wilderness - Rogue River-Siskiyou National Forest
 Rogue River-Siskiyou National Forest - Wild and Scenic Elk River

Klamath Mountains
Rogue River-Siskiyou National Forest
Protected areas of Curry County, Oregon
Wilderness areas of Oregon
Old-growth forests
1984 establishments in Oregon
Protected areas established in 1984